Joseph Hunter Duff (1 May 1913 – 1985) was an English footballer who made 126 appearances in the Football League playing as an inside forward for Rochdale.

Career statistics

References

1913 births
1985 deaths
English footballers
Association football inside forwards
Ashington A.F.C. players
Newcastle United F.C. players
Rochdale A.F.C. players
Cheltenham Town F.C. players
English Football League players